The Restless Sex is a 1920 American silent drama film starring Marion Davies, and Ralph Kellard. It was directed by Leon D'Usseau and Robert Z. Leonard and written by Frances Marion. The film is based upon the 1918 novel of the same name by Robert W. Chambers and was distributed by Paramount Pictures under the Famous Players-Lasky Corporation name.

A copy of The Restless Sex is housed at the Library of Congress and Gosfilmofond.

Synopsis
Stephanie (Steve) is a restless and adventurous young woman. She is in love with Jim, her foster brother and childhood sweetheart. But now, she also finds herself attracted to art student Oswald Grismer. Jim leaves for Paris to become an author. In this period, Steve and Oswald decide to marry each other. When Jim finds out, he returns home to win Steve over.

Cast
 Marion Davies as Steve
 Ralph Kellard as Jim Cleland
 Carlyle Blackwell as Oswald Grismer
 Charles Lane as John Cleland
 Corinne Barker as Helen Davis
 Stephen Carr as Jim as a boy
 Vivienne Osborne as Marie Cliff
 Etna Ross as Steve as a child
 Robert Vivian as Chilsmer Grismer
 Athole Shearer as Extra (uncredited)
 Edith Shearer as Extra (uncredited)
 Norma Shearer as Extra (uncredited)

Production
In her 9th film, Marion Davies portrays a restless young woman torn between two men. Costume design for the film, which featured a prolonged "Bal des Arts" sequence, was done by Erté. This was the first collaboration between Joseph Urban and Cosmopolitan Productions. In ball sequence Marion Davies portrays Pallas Athena, and Norma Shearer appears as an extra. This would prove to be the final American film for Carlyle Blackwell who would go to England and work in films for another decade.

Status
A DVD was released by Edward Lorusso with a music score by Donald Sosin in May 2015.

References

External links

Colorful lobby poster for the film

1920 films
1920 drama films
Silent American drama films
American silent feature films
American black-and-white films
Famous Players-Lasky films
Films based on American novels
Films based on works by Robert W. Chambers
Films directed by Robert Z. Leonard
Paramount Pictures films
Films with screenplays by Frances Marion
1920s American films
1920s English-language films